

Tsardom of Russia and Russian Empire 

Governorates of the Russian Empire was created by the edict (ukase) of Peter the Great on 18 December 1708 "On the establishment of the gubernias and cities assigned to them", which divided Russia into eight guberniyas. Peter appointed Governors-General only in the St. Petersburg and Azov governorates. The heads of the other six governorates were named by Peter as governors. Initially, the titles Governor-General (генерал-губернатор - general-gubernator) and Governor (губенатор - gubernator) were no different. The title was only an honorific title.

Tikhon Streshnev was the first governor of Moscow in 1709–1711. In 1712–1714, the capital of the Tsardom of Russia was moved to St. Petersburg.

The higher chief (главный начальник - glavny nachal'nik) was the head of the Moscow governorate since 1727. It was appointed by the Emperor. From time to time, the Emperor sometimes voluntarily called this position as "Governor-General" or "commander-in-chief".

In 1780s, older Moscow governorate was disestablished. The territory of former Moscow province becomes the new subdivision with the name "Moscow governorate". On 5 October 1781, Catherine II signed ukaz "On the Establishing of Moscow governorate". The title of the head was defined in this ukaz.

On 30 October 1816, the title "chief" (начальник - nachal'nik) was renamed "military governor-general" (военнный генерал-губернатор - voyenny general-gubernator). Vladimir Dolgorukov was appointed governor-general of the Moscow Military District for the first time without the word "military" in 1865.

During the existence of both the Moscow Governorate and the Moscow Governorate-General (with Moscow Governorate-General consisted only of the Moscow Governorate) as two administrative units in the same time, there were simultaneously two posts of heads of Moscow in the same time. The responsibilities between the Military Governor and the Civil Governor were divided in a very complex way.

In 1905, the Moscow gradonachalnik and Moscow Civil governor were subordinated to the Moscow Governor-General. Therefore there were three offices of heads of Moscow in the same time.

List

Tikhon Streshnev (1709–1711)
Vasili Yershov (1711–1712)
Mikhail Romodanovsky (1712–1713)
Alexei Petrovich Saltykov (1713–1716)
Kirill Alexeyevich Naryshkin (1716–1719)
Ivan Voeikov (1719–1726)
Pyotr Velyaminov-Zernov (1726–1738)
Ivan Romodanovsky (1727–1729)
Alexei Plescheyev (February–May 1727, 1729–1730)
Vasily Saltykov (March–October 1730)
Grigory Chernyshyov (1731–1735)
Ivan Baryatinsky (1735–1736)
Fyodor Nikolayevich Balk (1734–1738)
Boris Yusupov (1738–1740, 1740–1741)
Ivan Trubetskoy (May–December 1739)
Karl Biron (March–November 1740)
Vladimir Saltykov (1741–1751)
Alexander Buturlin (1742–1744, 1762–1763)
Vasily Levashov (1744–1751)
Semyon Ushakov (1751–1755)
Sergei Alexeyevich Golitsyn (1753–1756)
Nikolai Zherebtsov (1755–1762, 1762–1764)
Pyotr Cherkassky (1760–1762)
Pyotr Saltykov (1763–1771)
Grigory Grigorievich Orlov (September–November 1771)
Mikhail Volkonsky (1771–1780)
Vasily Dolgorukov-Krymsky (1780–1782)
Zakhar Chernyshyov (1782–1784)
Jacob Bruce (1784–1786)
Pyotr Dmitrievich Yeropkin (1786–1790)
Alexander Prozorovsky (1790–1795)
Mikhail Izmailov (1795–1797)
Yuri Vladimirovich Dolgorukov (May–November 1797)
Ivan Saltykov (1797–1804)
Alexander Bekleshov (1804–1806)
Timofei Tutolmin (1806–1809)
Ivan Gudovich (1809–1812)
Fyodor Rostopchin (1812–1814)
Alexander Tormasov (1814–1819)
Dmitry Golitsyn (1820–1844)
Alexei Grigorievich Scherbatov (1844–1848)
Arseniy Zakrevsky (1848–1859)
Sergei Stroganov (April–September 1859)
Pavel Tuchkov (1859–1864)
Mikhail Ofrosimov (1864–1865)
Vladimir Andreyevich Dolgorukov (1865–1891)
Grand Duke Sergei Alexandrovich (1891–1905)
Alexander Kozlov (April–July 1905)
Pyotr Durnovo (July–November 1905)
Fyodor Dubasov (1905–1906)
Sergei Gershelman (1906–1909)
Vladimir Dzhunkovsky (1908–1913)
Alexander Adrianov (1908–1915)
Count Felix Sumarokov-Elston (May–September 1915)
Joseph Mrozovsky (1915–1917)
Mikhail Chelnokov (March 1 – 6, 1917)
Nikolai Kishkin (March–September 1917)

Gorodskoy golova 

Gorodskoy golova (городской голова, literally "City's head"), the head of the Moscow Executive body, was appointed by Moscow City Duma. This office is roughly equals the post of speaker of regional or municipal parliament with executive powers.

The post was established by Empress Catherine II in 1767. Gorodskoy golova was elected for a term of three years, and was confirmed in office by the Governor. In accordance with the city regulations of 1862 and 1870, Gorodskoy golova was elected for 4 years and approved by the Emperor. Gorodskoy golova was subordinate to the Governor-General. He presided over meetings of the Moscow city Duma.

Gradonachalnik 

On 1 January 1905 Nicholas II established Moscow City Authority (московское градоначальство - moskovskoye gradonachal'stvo), largely independent of the Moscow Governorate. Moscow City Authority was headed by gradonachalnik (градоначальник, literally "city's chief").

 Ivan Nikolayevich Rudnev (acting, 1 January 1905 – 16 January 1905)
 Evgeny Nikolayevich Volkov (16 January 1905 – 18 April 1905)
 Pavel Pavlovich Shuvalov (18 April 1905 – 28 June 1905)
 Ivan Nikolayevich Rudnev (acting, 28 June 1905 – 16 July 1905)
 Georgy Petrovich von Medem (16 July 1905 – 30 December 1905)
 Anatoly Anatolyevich Reynbot (7 January 1906 – 11 December 1907)
 Aleksandr Aleksandrovich Adrianov (7 February 1908 – 30 May 1915)
 Vadim Nikolayevich Shebeko (17 February 1916 – 1 March 1917)

Russian SFSR
Both state and communist officeholders were called heads of Moscow.

Communist heads of Moscow

Until March 1990, the first secretaries of the Moscow City Committee of the CPSU were the de facto real influential leaders of Moscow

State (nominal) heads of Moscow

Chairmen of the Presidium of the Executive Committee of Moscow Council of Workers' Deputies:
Viktor Nogin (September to November 1917)

Chairmen of the Presidium of the Moscow Council of Workers' and Soldiers' Deputies:
Mikhail Pokrovsky (1917–1918)

Chairmen of the Presidium of the Moscow Council of Workers' and Red Armymen's Deputies:
Pyotr Smidovich (March to October 1918)

Chairmen of the Presidium of the Moscow Council of Workers', Peasants' and Red Armymen's Deputies:
Lev Kamenev (1918–1926)

Chairmen of the Executive Committee of the Moscow Council of Workers', Peasants' and Red Armymen's Deputies:
Konstantin Ukhanov (1926–1929)

Chairmen of the Executive Committee of the Moscow Regional Council of Workers', Peasants' and Red Armymen's Deputies:
Konstantin Ukhanov (1929–1931)

Chairmen of the Executive Committee of the Moscow City Council of Workers', Peasants' and Red Armymen's Deputies:
Nikolai Bulganin (1931–1937)
Ivan Sidorov (1937–1938)
Aleksandr Yefremov (1938–1939)

Chairmen of the Executive Committee of the Moscow City Council of Labourers' Deputies:
Vasili Pronin (1939–1944)
Georgi Popov (1944–1949)
Mikhail Yasnov (1950–1956)
Nikolai Bobrovnikov (1956–1961)
Nikolai Dygai (1961–1963)
Vladimir Promyslov (1963–1977)

Chairmen of the Executive Committee of the Moscow City Council of People's Deputies:
Vladimir Promyslov (1977–1985)
Valery Saikin (1986–1990)
Yury Luzhkov (1990–1991)

Moscow after 1991

Mayor of Moscow is the holder of the highest office of subject of the Russian Federation. The separate office of the Premier of the Government of Moscow existed from 1991 to 2001.

Mayors:
Gavriil Popov (1991–1992)
Yuri Luzhkov (1992–2010)
Vladimir Resin (2010) (acting)
Sergey Sobyanin (2010–present)

See also
First Secretary of the Moscow Communist Party
List of heads of Saint Petersburg government

References 

Moscow, Heads
Politics of Moscow

de:Liste der Bürgermeister von Moskau
fr:Liste des maires de Moscou